Mid-Ocean Escort Force (MOEF) referred to the organisation of anti-submarine escorts for World War II trade convoys between Canada and Newfoundland, and the British Isles.  The allocation of United States, British, and Canadian escorts to these convoys reflected preferences of the United States upon their declaration of war, and the organisation persisted through the winter of 1942–43 despite withdrawal of United States ships from the escort groups.  By the summer of 1943, United States Atlantic escorts were focused on the faster CU convoys and the UG convoys between Chesapeake Bay and the Mediterranean Sea; and only British and Canadian escorts remained on the HX, SC and ON convoys.

Background 
On the basis of experience during World War I, the Admiralty instituted trade convoys in United Kingdom coastal waters from September 1939. Anti-submarine escorts were allocated on the basis of perceived threat.  Early German Type II submarines from bases in Germany were unable to operate effectively beyond European coastal waters. Following acquisition of bases in Norway and France, German Type IX submarines and German Type VII submarines refuelled by German Type XIV submarines operated in the mid-Atlantic beyond the range of patrolling aircraft.  Many anti-submarine escorts lacked the endurance to accompany convoys through the mid-Atlantic. HX 129 left Halifax on 27 May 1941 as the first convoy to receive escort for the entire trip. Escorts based in Halifax Harbour handed HX 129 off to escorts based in Newfoundland who subsequently transferred HX 129 to escorts based in Iceland who in turn delivered HX 129 to escorts based in the Western Approaches.

American escorts 

In Newfoundland on 9 August 1941, President Franklin D. Roosevelt agreed to provide American destroyers for the Canada to Iceland portion of HX convoys and westbound ON convoys. HX 150 sailed 16 September 1941 as the first convoy with American escort. ON 18 sailed 24 September as the first westbound convoy with American escort. The Royal Canadian Navy continued to escort the SC convoys and their slower ON counterparts. Canadian escort groups were increased from a nominal strength of four ships to six – typically one Canadian River-class destroyer with five s.

The    was torpedoed while escorting Convoy SC 48 on 17 October 1941.  Clemson-class destroyer  was torpedoed and sunk on 31 October 1941 while escorting Convoy HX 156. When the United States declared war, American escort groups typically contained five destroyers, although six United States Coast Guard s were included within the pool of ships rotating in and out of these escort groups.

Long-range escort organization 
As the United States Navy struggled to find enough destroyers to meet escort needs for both the Pacific and the vulnerable Atlantic coastal shipping, the shorter great-circle route from Newfoundland to the British Isles was considered as a means of eliminating meeting point delays and reducing the number of destroyers required for escort of convoys between Canada and the United Kingdom. Initial proposals by the United States on 24 January 1942 produced an agreement in early February for a Mid-Ocean Escort Force organisation of fourteen Escort Groups. American-led Escort Groups were prefixed with the letter "A"; while "B" indicated British-led Escort Groups and "C" designated Canadian-led Escort Groups. Fifteen United States destroyers, fifteen Royal Navy destroyers and twelve Canadian destroyers were to provide the striking power of these escort groups while 52 British and 49 Canadian Flower-class corvettes were to perform the patrolling role. Approximately one-third of the theoretical MOEF escort Group strength of three destroyers and seven corvettes was unavailable at any given time. Half of the unavailable ships needed storm or battle damage repairs, and the remainder were undergoing normal refit and training.

Each MOEF escort Group worked in a 33-day cycle allowing nine and one-half days with a westbound ON convoy, six days in St. John's, Newfoundland, nine and one-half days with an eastbound HX or SC convoy, and 8 days refit in Derry. The shorter routing away from Iceland eliminated the need for most escorts to attempt maintenance in Iceland's poorly equipped Hvalfjörður anchorage; but the United States was required to maintain an additional force of five destroyers in Iceland to escort ships between trans-Atlantic convoys and United States military occupation bases.  The Royal Navy continued to provide an eastern local escort force of naval trawlers in the Western Approaches while Canada continued to provide a Western Local Escort Force (WLEF) of corvettes, minesweepers, and short-range destroyers between Halifax Harbour and Newfoundland.

Initial MOEF Escort Group composition 

 Escort Group B-1: H-class destroyer  with  Rockingham, V-class destroyer , and Flower-class corvettes ,  and 

 Escort Group B-4: H-class destroyer  with Town-class destroyer Roxborough, W-class destroyer , and Flower-class corvettes ,  and 

Shortage of destroyers 

Corvettes had adequate endurance for MOEF assignments, but the fuel economy of destroyers was poor at the speeds that convoys operated. The escort group leaders were modern destroyers with adequate endurance but, of the older destroyers allocated to trade convoy escort, only the Clemson subgroup of the Town-class destroyers proved suitable for MOEF assignments. Wickes-class destroyers were useful for the Canadian WLEF and the American Iceland shuttle; but lacked endurance to stay with a trade convoy for the full distance covered by the MOEF Escort Groups. The Admiralty converted some V and W-class destroyers to long range escorts by removing the forward boiler and using the space for additional fuel tanks.

The remaining American destroyers were diverted from MOEF assignments to troop convoys and in response to the U-boat's Second happy time off the American east coast. Escort Groups A-1 and A-2 were disbanded when their modern American destroyer leaders were assigned elsewhere. Escort Group B5 was reassigned to Caribbean trade convoys in March 1942. Beginning in April, the following eleven groups escorted HX convoys, SC convoys, and ON convoys through the winter of 1942–43:

Escort Group A-3 

 Convoy HX 185 was escorted without loss.
Gleaves-class destroyer Gleaves left the escort group after convoy ON 92 lost seven ships. USCG Treasury-class cutters Spencer and  assumed escort leader responsibility. Flower-class corvettes Mayflower and  replaced Flower-class corvettes Chilliwack, Shediac and Algoma.
 Convoy HX 190 was escorted without loss.
 Convoys HX 196 and ON 114 were escorted without loss.
 Convoy ON 125 was escorted without loss. Flower-class corvette Rosthern joined the group.
 Convoys ON 135 and HX 212 were escorted without loss.
Flower-class corvette Dianthus replaced Flower-class corvettes Mayflower and Bittersweet.
Flower-class corvette  rotated into the group.
 Convoys SC 111, ON 156 and HX 223 were escorted without loss.
 Convoy ON 166 lost eleven ships.
 Convoy SC 121 lost seven ships.
 Convoy ON 175 was escorted without loss.
The escort group was then redesignated C-5 under Canadian command after the USCG Treasury-class cutters were reassigned for conversion to amphibious force flagships.

Escort Group B-1 
Flower-class corvettes ,  and  joined the group; and Venomous was replaced by the long-range W-class escort . Convoys HX 187, ON 96, HX 193, ON 108, SC 92, ON 119, HX 201, ON 124, HX 206, ON 134, SC 105, HX 215, ON 151, SC 114, ON 162, SC 119, ON 171 and HX 230 were escorted without loss.

Escort Group B-2

Convoys SC 81, ON 97, SC 86, ON 107, HX 198, ON 118, HX 203, ON 128, HX 208, ON 138, HX 213, ON 148, HX 219 and ON 159 were escorted without loss. Convoy SC 118 lost eight ships. Convoys ON 170, SC 123 and ONS 4 were escorted without loss.

Escort Group B-3 
Flower-class corvette  replaced Heartsease and the four corvettes with Free French crews (Aconit, Lobelia, Renoncule and Roselys) were assigned to this group. Convoys HX 188, ON 98, HX 194, ON 110, SC 93, ON 121, HX 202, ON 126, HX 207, ON 136, SC 106, ON 146, HX 218, ON 157 and SC 117 were escorted without loss. Convoy ON 167 lost two ships. U-444 was rammed by the group leader Harvester. U-432 was then sunk by Aconit. Thornycroft type leader  was assigned as group leader replacement. Convoy ON 174 was escorted without loss.

Escort Group B-4 
Flower-class corvettes ,  and  joined the group; and the low-endurance destroyer Roxborough was replaced by the Town-class destroyer Beverley. Convoys SC 82, ON 99, SC 87, ON 109, HX 199, ON 120, HX 204 and ON 130 were escorted without loss. Convoys ON 140, HX 214, ON 150, HX 220, ON 161 and ON 169 were escorted without loss. Convoy HX 229 lost twelve ships.

Escort Group B-6 

Convoys SC 83, ON 101, SC 88, ON 111 and HX 200 were escorted without loss. Convoys HX 205 and ON 132 were escorted without loss. Convoy SC 104 lost seven ships. Convoys ON 155, SC 116, ON 165, HX 227, ONS 1 and SC 125 were escorted without loss.

Escort Group B-7 

Convoys HX 186, ON 94, HX 192, ON 106, SC 91, ON 117, SC 103, ON 142 and HX 216 were escorted without loss. The D-class destroyer  was assigned as replacement group leader; and the new   joined the group. Convoys SC 115, ON 164, SC 120 and ON 173 were escorted without loss. Convoy ONS 5 lost eleven ships.

Escort Group C-1 
Convoy HX 189 was escorted without loss. Convoys HX 195 and ON 112 were escorted without loss. Convoy SC 94 lost ten ships. Convoys ON 123, SC 99, ON 133, HX 211, ON 143 and SC 110 were escorted without loss. Flower-class corvettes Orillia, Chambly and Eyebright rotated out of the group. Convoy ON 154 lost thirteen ships. Flower-class corvette Chilliwack was replaced by new River-class frigate . Convoys ONS 2 and SC 127 were escorted without loss.

Escort Group C-2 

Convoys SC 84, ON 103 and SC 89 were escorted without loss. Destroyer  replaced destroyer St. Laurent; and Flower-class corvette Dauphin joined the group. Convoys HX 201 and ON 119 were escorted without loss. Convoy SC 97 lost two ships torpedoed by  while Morden sank . Convoys ON 129 and SC 102 were escorted without loss. Destroyer  replaced destroyer Burnham; and Flower-class corvettes  and Primrose replaced Flower-class corvettes Dauphin and Brandon. Flower-class corvette Orillia joined the group. Convoys SC 108, ON 149 and SC 113 were escorted without loss. New River-class frigates  and  joined the group. Convoys ON 160, HX 225 and ON 179 were escorted without loss.

Escort Group C-3 
Convoys ON 93, HX 191, ON 104 and SC 90 were escorted without loss. Flower-class corvette Camrose was replaced by corvette Agassiz. Convoys HX 202, ON 121, SC 98, ON 131, HX 210 and ON 141 were escorted without loss. Town-class destroyer Burnham replaced Saguenay. Flower-class corvettes Wetaskiwin, Sackville, Galt and Agassiz were replaced by corvettes Bittersweet, Eyebright,  and Mayflower. The new River-class frigate  joined the group. Convoys ON 152, HX 221, ON 163, HX 226, ON 172, SC 124 and ON 180 were escorted without loss.

Escort Group C-4 
Convoys ON 95, SC 85, ON 105, HX 197, ON 116 and SC 96 were escorted without loss. Convoys SC 101 and ON 137 were escorted without loss. Convoy SC 107 lost fifteen ships. Destroyer St. Croix was replaced by Town-class destroyer Churchill and Flower-class corvette Arvida was replaced by corvettes Brandon and Collingwood. Convoys ON 147, SC 112 and ON 158 were escorted without loss. Convoys ON 177 and HX 235 were escorted without loss.

Spring of 1943 

Convoy ON 168 was escorted without loss. Convoy SC 122 lost eight ships. Convoy SC 126 was escorted without loss.

River-class frigates brought two significant advantages to MOEF. Their numbers allowed the older escorts time to refit with modern sensors like 10-centimeter radar and modern anti-submarine weapons like the Hedgehog projector. Destroyers replaced by new frigates were formed into mobile support groups able to move rapidly to convoys coming under attack. Through 1943, new escort carriers became available to increase the surveillance capability of support groups. As the winter weather cleared, new Very Long Range Consolidated B-24 Liberator patrol bombers extended surveillance into the mid-Atlantic.

See also 
 Mid-Ocean Meeting Point
 Mid-Atlantic Gap

Notes

References 
 
 
 
 
 
 
 
 
 
 
 

Battle of the Atlantic
Escort Groups of the Royal Navy in World War II
North Atlantic convoys of World War II
Royal Canadian Navy
Naval battles and operations of World War II involving the United Kingdom